Kaveinga occipitalis is a species of ground beetle in the subfamily Rhysodinae. It was described by Grouvelle in 1903.

References

Kaveinga
Beetles described in 1903